The Finnish maritime cluster is a cluster of Finnish companies in maritime industries. In 2016 the total turnover was estimated at 13 billion euros and it employed 48,000 people.

History
Small trading ships similar to Jacobstads Wapen were built in Finnish coastal towns in the 18th century. Small-scale shipyards continued to exist well into the 20th century. The first large scale shipyard was the galley dry dock at Sveaborg built in the mid-18th century, which serviced the ships that won one of the largest sea battles in Finnish history.

The first industrial scale shipyard in Turku was established in 1732. After the Crimean War, William Crichton acquired a workshop and built a new shipyard, which later absorbed smaller shipyards and developed into Crichton-Vulcan and merged with Wärtsilä between 1936 and 1938. Germany outsourced a notable amount of submarine construction to Finland after World War I. This section of industry was later outlawed by the Paris Peace Treaty, but it became an important foundation for the Finnish maritime industry.

Soviet trade
A major boost to Finnish shipbuilding was the war reparations paid to the Soviet Union after World War II. They forced a rapid industrialization of Finland and the creation of a large metal industry in addition to the traditional papermaking and forest industries. By 1953, the shipbuilding industry had six times the capacity it did in 1944.

Bilateral trade with the Soviet Union forced Finnish shipyards to build ships with a high percentage of total value of Finnish origin. All major components of the finished products needed to be produced domestically. The high percentage of domestic components continues even after the dissolution of the Soviet Union and the end of the lucrative trade deals. While ships built in other European shipyards are a collection of components from around Europe and around the world, ships built in Finland can have up to 90% of their total value in Finnish components and labor (kotimaisuusaste).

Major companies

 Meyer Turku, with a major shipyard in Turku.
 Rauma Marine Constructions, with a shipyard in Rauma.
 Uki Workboat with a shipyard in Uusikaupunki.
 ABB, formerly Strömberg, producer of Azipod Azimuth thrusters and electrical systems
 Hollming Group, now part of Aker Finnyards; producer of Aquamaster (now Rolls-Royce) Z-drive Azimuth thrusters
 Rolls-Royce Oy Ab, Rauma, propulsion and azimuth thrusters
 Kone Corporation
 Cargotec (Split from KONE in 2005, formerly Navire Cargo Gear and MacGregor) provides cargo-handling solutions
 Wärtsilä provides maritime diesel engines
 Sanitec, a former subsidiary of Wärtsilä, provides closed loop sanitation systems
Steerprop, Rauma, Azimuth Propulsors
 Deltamarin, naval architecture
 Aker Arctic, naval architecture and ice model testing

Notable ships and vessels

Icebreakers
 Sisu (1939)
 Voima (1954)
 Sampo (1960)
 Atle-class icebreakers (1974)
 Otso (1986) and Kontio (1987)
 Nuclear powered icebreakers
NS Taymyr (1989)
NS Vaygach (1990)
 Fennica (1993) and Nordica (1994)
 Polaris (2016)

Cruise ships
 Song of Norway (1970)
 Royal Princess (1984, 44,348 tons)
 Birka Princess (1986)
  (1990, 70,390 tons)
 Birka Queen (1992)
  (1996, 81,500 tons)
  (1999, 142,000 tons)
  (2001, 85,700 tons)
 Birka Paradise (2004)
  (2006, 158,000 tons)
  (2009, 220,000 tons), formerly known as "Project Genesis"
 Mein Schiff class (2014, 99,526 tons), total of 5 cruise ships has been built and 2 more will be built in the future.
  (2019, 183,200 tons), total of 4 ships will be built.
  (2022, 200,000 tons), total 2 ships will be built.

Cruiseferries
 GTS Finnjet (1977)
 M/S Rosella (1980)
 M/S Viking Saga (1980) and M/S Viking Song (1980)
 M/S Finlandia (1980) and M/S Silvia Regina (1981)
 M/S Svea (1985) and M/S Wellamo (1986)
 M/S Mariella (1985) and M/S Olympia (1986)
 M/S Athena (1989) and M/S Kalypso (1990)
 M/S Cinderella (1989)
 M/S Silja Serenade (1990) and M/S Silja Symphony (1991)
 M/S Romantika (2002) and M/S Victoria I (2004)
 M/S Color Fantasy (2004) and M/S Color Magic (2007)
 M/S Galaxy (2006) and M/S Baltic Queen (2008)
 M/S Viking XPRS (2008)
 M/S Viking Grace (2013)

ROPAX ferries
 MV Ulysses (2001)
 M/S Superspeed 1 (2008)
 M/S Megastar (2017)

Navy ships
 Ilmarinen (1931), first battleship with a diesel-electric drive
 Turunmaa-class gunboats (1963)
 Pohjanmaa (1979)
 Helsinki-class missile boats (1981)
 Rauma-class missile boats (1990)
 Hämeenmaa-class minelayers (1992)
 Hamina-class missile boats (1998)
 Tuuli (2002)
 Louhi (2011)
 Jehu-class landing crafts (2012)
 Turva (2014)
 Pohjanmaa-class corvettes (planned)

Submarines
 Saukko (1930)
 Vetehinen-class submarines (1930)
 Vesikko (1934)
 Mir (1987)

References

External links
 The Finnish Maritime Cluster Study
 The Finnish Maritime Cluster 2003
 Aker Yards
 Developing bigger and better cruise ships at hightechfinland.com

Shipbuilding companies of Finland
Economy of Finland
Ships of Finland
 
Finland–Soviet Union relations